The Elizabeth Taylor Diamond, formerly known as the Krupp Diamond, is a  diamond that was bought by Richard Burton for his wife, Elizabeth Taylor in 1968. The diamond was one of a number of significant pieces of jewellery owned by Taylor, her collection also included the 68 carat Taylor–Burton Diamond, which was bought by the couple in 1969. The diamond was sold by Taylor's estate in 2011 for $8.8 million.

Description
The Elizabeth Taylor Diamond is an Asscher cut diamond with a fairly large culet facet, indicating it was likely cut before the 1920s, when culet facets were being phased out. A report (1132411262) dated 9 May 2011 from the Gemological Institute of America states that the diamond is D colour, VS1 clarity; accompanied by a diagram indicating that the clarity may be potentially internally flawless.

There is a supplemental letter from the Gemological Institute of America stating that the diamond has been determined to be a Type IIa diamond. Type IIa diamonds are the most chemically pure type of diamond, and often have exceptional optical transparency. Type IIa diamonds were first identified as originating from India, particularly from the Golconda region, but have since been recovered in all major diamond-producing regions of the world. Famous examples of Type IIa diamonds are the 530.20 carat Cullinan I and the 105.60 carat Koh-i-Noor.
 
The supplemental letter from the GIA is accompanied by a monograph from the Gemological Institute of America which features additional photographs, data collection charts and gemological research which details the rarity of the Elizabeth Taylor Diamond.

History
The diamond was originally named after the Krupp family of German industrialists, and it was sold as part of the estate of Vera Krupp (1909–1967), second wife of Alfried Krupp.

Burton bought the Krupp diamond on May 17, 1968, at an auction in New York for $307,000, and presented Taylor with the diamond on their yacht, the Kalizma while it was moored on the River Thames in London.

Elizabeth Taylor wore the Krupp Diamond as a ring, and called it her favorite piece. The Krupp Diamond and other famous pieces of jewellery in Taylor's collection became part of Taylor's image. After Taylor's death, the stone was renamed "The Elizabeth Taylor Diamond". 

Taylor often wore her own jewellery including the Krupp Diamond in films, television movies, and personal appearances when she considered it appropriate.

Taylor died in 2011 and the diamond was auctioned at Christie's by her estate on 16 December 2011, having been renamed the Elizabeth Taylor Diamond. It was sold for $8,818,500 (including buyer's premium, equivalent to $ as of ), to the South Korean conglomerate E-Land, setting a record price per carat US$265,697 for a colorless diamond.

See also
 Taylor–Burton Diamond, bought by Taylor and Burton in 1969
 List of diamonds

References and sources
References

Sources

 
  
 
 

Krupp
Individual diamonds
Diamond
Richard Burton
Individual rings